Närhi is a Finnish surname. Notable people with the surname include:

 Matti Närhi (born 1975), Finnish javelin thrower
 Laura Närhi (born 1978), Finnish pop singer

Finnish-language surnames